Slapstick is a style of humor involving exaggerated physical activity that exceeds the boundaries of normal physical comedy. Slapstick may involve both intentional violence and violence by mishap, often resulting from inept use of props such as saws and ladders. 

The term arises from a device developed for use in the broad, physical comedy style known as commedia dell'arte in 16th-century Italy. The "slap stick" consists of two thin slats of wood, which make a "slap" when striking another actor, with little force needed to make a loud—and comical—sound. The physical slap stick remains a key component of the plot in the traditional and popular Punch and Judy puppet show. Other examples of slapstick humor include The Naked Gun and Mr. Bean.

Origins
The name "slapstick" originates from the Italian Batacchio or Bataccio – called the "slap stick" in English –  a club-like object composed of two wooden slats used in commedia dell'arte. When struck, the Batacchio produces a loud smacking noise, though it is only a little force that is transferred from the object to the person being struck. Actors may thus hit one another repeatedly with great audible effect while causing no damage and only very minor, if any, pain.  Along with the inflatable bladder (of which the whoopee cushion is a modern variant), it was among the earliest special effects.

Early uses

Slapstick comedy's history is measured in centuries. Shakespeare incorporated many chase scenes and beatings into his comedies, such as in his play The Comedy of Errors. 

In early 19th-century England, pantomime acquired its present form which includes slapstick comedy: its most famous performer, Joseph Grimaldi—the father of modern clowning—would partake in slapstick, with the Smithsonian stating he "fought himself in hilarious fisticuffs that had audiences rolling in the aisles". Comedy routines also featured heavily in British music hall theatre which became popular in the 1850s. 

In Punch and Judy shows, which first appeared in England on 9 May 1662, a large slapstick is wielded by Punch against the other characters.

Fred Karno

British comedians who honed their skills at pantomime and music hall sketches include Charlie Chaplin, Stan Laurel, George Formby, and Dan Leno. The influential English music hall comedian and theatre impresario Fred Karno developed a form of sketch comedy without dialogue in the 1890s, and Chaplin and Laurel were among the young comedians who worked for him as part of "Fred Karno's Army". Chaplin's fifteen-year music hall career inspired the comedy in all his later film work, especially as pantomimicry. In a biography of Karno, Laurel stated: "Fred Karno didn't teach Charlie [Chaplin] and me all we know about comedy. He just taught us most of it". American film producer Hal Roach described Karno as "not only a genius, he is the man who originated slapstick comedy. We in Hollywood owe much to him."

In film and television
Building on its later popularity in the 19th and early 20th-century ethnic routines of the American vaudeville house, the style was explored extensively during the "golden era" of black and white movies directed by Mack Sennett and  Hal Roach that featured such notables as Charlie Chaplin, Mabel Normand Laurel and Hardy  Abbott & Costello  and Three Stooges. Silent slapstick comedy was also popular in early French films and included films by Max Linder, Charles Prince, and Sarah Duhamel.

Slapstick also became a common element in animated cartoons starting in the 1930; examples include Disney's Mickey Mouse and Donald Duck shorts, Walter Lantz's Woody Woodpecker and The Beary Family, MGM's Tom and Jerry, the unrelated Tom and Jerry cartoons of Van Beuren Studios, Warner Bros. Looney Tunes/Merrie Melodies, MGM's Barney Bear, and Tex Avery's Screwy Squirrel. Slapstick was later used in Japanese Tokusatsu TV Kamen Rider Drive, by Benny Hill in The Benny Hill Show in the UK, and in the US used in the three 1960s TV series, Gilligan's Island, Batman, The Flying Nun and I Love Lucy.

20th century fad

Use of the slapstick in public places was a fad in the early 20th century.

During the 1911 Veiled Prophet Parade in St. Louis, according to the St. Louis Post-Dispatch,

The slapstick, so long indispensable to low comedy, found a new use among the crowds . . . they used the slapstick to the extreme embarrassment of many women. The carnival spirit, for the most part tempered by high good humor, at times verged on rowdyism. Girls used a stick ripped with feathers to tickle the faces of young men, and they retaliated vigorously with the slapstick.
An editorial in the Asbury Park Press, New Jersey, said in 1914:

Slapsticks are the latest "fun-making" fad for masque fetes. 
 . . . Orders to stop the slapstick nuisance should be issued by the police and the Asbury Park carnival commissioners. Any device that cannot be operated or used without inflicting unmerited pain and injury should be excluded . . . .

See also

 List of slapstick comedy topics
 Slapstick film
 Cartoon violence
 Stage combat
 Schadenfreude
 Harisen, a paper fan used by the Japanese for a similar purpose.

References

External links 
 

 
Film genres